Thekla Charlotte Knudtzon Brun-Lie (born 2 September 1992) is a Norwegian former biathlete.

Career
She competed at the 2018 IBU Open European Championships in Italy, where she won a gold medal in Single mixed relay along with Vetle Sjåstad Christiansen.

Her sister Celine Brun-Lie is an international cross-country skier.

References

External links

1992 births
Living people
Skiers from Oslo
Norwegian female biathletes
21st-century Norwegian women